

BT Digital Music Awards
Launched in 2002, the BT Digital Music Awards were held annually in the United Kingdom.

|-
| 2005
| Stereophonics
| Best Rock Artist 
| 
|-
| 2007
| Stereophonics' Bank Holiday Monday Ticket/Download Promotion 
| Best Artist Promotion
|

BRIT Awards
The BRIT Awards are the British Phonographic Industry's annual pop music awards. Stereophonics have received one awards from 5 nominations.

|-
| 1998 || Stereophonics || British Breakthrough Act  ||  
|-
| rowspan="2" | 2000 || Stereophonics || Best British Group || 
|-
| Performance & Cocktails || Best British Album || 
|-
| 2002 || Stereophonics || Best British Group || 
|-
| 2004 || Stereophonics || Best British Rock Act || 
|-

Global Awards
The Global Awards are held by Global to honor music played on British radio stations.

|-
| rowspan=2|2019
| rowspan=6|Stereophonics
| Best Group
| 
|-
| rowspan=2|Best Indie
| 
|-
| rowspan=3|2020
| 
|-
| The Global Special Award
| 
|-
| Best Group
| 
|-
|2022
| Best Indie
|

Kerrang! Awards
The Kerrang! Awards is an annual music awards show in the United Kingdom, founded by the music magazine, Kerrang! and focusing primarily on rock music. 

|-
|-
| rowspan=2|1999
| Performance and Cocktails
| Best Album
| 
|-
| rowspan=4|Stereophonics
| rowspan=4|Best British Band
| 
|-
| 2000
| 
|-
| 2003
| 
|-
| 2005
|

Meteor Music Awards
A Meteor Ireland Music Award was an accolade bestowed upon professionals in the music industry in Ireland and further afield.

|-
| 2002 || Stereophonics || Best International Group ||

MTV Europe Music Awards
The MTV Europe Music Awards were established in 1994 by MTV Europe to celebrate the most popular music videos in Europe. Stereophonics have received one nomination.

|-
| 2005 || Stereophonics || Best UK & Ireland Act ||

Mercury Prize
The Mercury Prize, formerly the Mercury Music Prize, is an annual music prize awarded for the best album from the United Kingdom or Ireland.

|-
| 1999
| Performance and Cocktails
| Album of the Year
| 
|

NME Awards
The NME Awards were created by the NME magazine and was first held in 1953.

|-
| 1998
| Stereophonics
| Best New Act
| 
|-
| rowspan=3|1999
| Word Gets Around
| Best Album
| 
|-
| "Local Boy in the Photograph"
| Best Single
|
|-
| rowspan=2|Stereophonics
| rowspan=2|Best Band
| 
|-
| rowspan=2|2000
| 
|-
| Performance and Cocktails
| Best Album
|

Q Awards
The Q Awards are hosted annually by the music magazine Q.

|-
| rowspan=3|1999
| Performance and Cocktails
| Best Album
| 
|-
| rowspan=5|Stereophonics
| Best Live Act 
| 
|-
| rowspan=3|Best Act in the World Today
| 
|-
| 2000
| 
|-
| rowspan=4|2001
| 
|-
| Best Live Act
| 
|-
| Just Enough Education to Perform
| Best Album
| 
|-
| "Have a Nice Day"
| Best Single
| 
|-
| 2002
| Themselves
| Best Act in the World Today
| 
|-
| 2007
| "Local Boy in the Photograph"
| Classic Song
|

Silver Clef Award
The Silver Clef Award is an annual UK music awards lunch which has been running since 1976.

|-
| 2009
| Stereophonics
| Best British Act Award
| 
|-
| 2018
| Stereophonics
| Icon Award
|

Smash Hits Poll Winners Party
The Smash Hits Poll Winners Party was an awards ceremony which ran from 1988 to 2005. Each award winner was voted by readers of the Smash Hits magazine.

|-
| 1999
| rowspan=3|Stereophonics
| rowspan=3|Best Indie/Rock Act
| 
|-
| 2000
| 
|-
| 2002
|

Top of the Pops Awards
The Top of the Pops Awards were awarded annually by television programme Top of the Pops.

|-
| 2001
| Themselves
| Best Rock Act
|

References

Stereophonics
British music-related lists